Ghiran is a coastal town in Libya.

Transport 
Ghiran lies near the proposed Libyan Railways line.

The earthworks for the new lines under construction can be seen on the aerial photographs.

There is also an airport nearby.

See also 
 Transport in Libya

References 

Populated places in Misrata District